Xanthorrhoea brevistyla is a species of grasstree of the genus Xanthorrhoea native to Western Australia.

Description
It blooms between October and December producing white flowers.

Classification
The species was first formally described by Desmond Herbert in 1921 as part of the work The genus Xanthorrhoea in Western Australia as published in Journal and Proceedings of the Royal Society of Western Australia.

Distribution
It has a limited distribution in the Wheatbelt and Great Southern regions of Western Australia. It extends from Narrogin in the north to Cranbrook in the south where it grows in sandy-clay soils over laterite.

References

Asparagales of Australia
brevistyla
Angiosperms of Western Australia
Plants described in 1921
Endemic flora of Southwest Australia